
Princess Theatre or Princess Theater may refer to:

In Australia
 Princess Theatre (Fremantle), Western Australia
 Princess Theatre (Launceston), Tasmania
 Princess Theatre (Melbourne), Victoria
 Princess Theatre (Woolloongabba), Brisbane (1888-1889)

In Canada
 Princess Theatre (Edmonton), Alberta
 Princess Theatre, Toronto, Ontario - Opened as The Academy of Music in 1890; renamed Princess in 1895; destroyed by fire in 1915 and rebuilt; demolished in 1931 to make way for University Avenue extension.

In the United Kingdom
 Princess Theatre, Hunstanton, Norfolk, England
 Princess Theatre (Torquay), Devon, England

In the United States
 Princess Theatre (Bloomington, Indiana), in the National Register of Historic Places listings in Monroe County, Indiana
 Princess Theatre (Decatur, Alabama)
 Princess Theatre (New York City, 1913–1955)
 Princess Theatre (New York, 29th Street), open from 1875 to 1907, known as the Princess Theatre from 1902 to 1907
 Princess Theatre (New York City, 1980–1984), operating on site of the Latin Quarter nightclub
 Princess Theatre (Portland, Oregon), now known as the Star Theater

See also
Prince's Theatre
Princess's Theatre, London, England
Princess of Wales Theatre, Toronto, Canada
Prince of Wales Theatre, London, England
Teatro Princesa, Valencia, Spain